Keir O'Donnell is an Australian–American actor, best known for his roles in the films Wedding Crashers, The Break-Up, Paul Blart: Mall Cop and American Sniper as well as numerous television appearances.

Early life
O'Donnell attended high school at The Bromfield School, and was involved in numerous productions both on the festival circuit and in community theater. In 1996 he was awarded a Massachusetts High School Drama Guild Acting Scholarship. Upon graduation he joined the first class of the newly created four-year classical theatre acting conservatory at The Hartt School in Hartford, Connecticut. The Hartt School of Theatre was established by Malcolm Morrison and Alan Rust (North Carolina School of the Arts). At the Hartt School he performed in numerous plays including Three Sisters, Lysistrata, Twelfth Night, Philadelphia Here I Come, and played Romeo in Romeo and Juliet opposite Hannah Mello. He graduated in 2000 and was accepted to the Hartford Stage Co. Regional Theatre, where he appeared in Macbeth and A Christmas Carol. In the fall of 2001 he was cast as a lead in the US premiere of The Man Who Never Yet Saw Woman's Nakedness by Moritz Rinke, at The Odyssey Theatre in West Los Angeles.

Feature films
After several student and independent films, O'Donnell landed the role of Todd Cleary in Wedding Crashers. The film went on to become the highest grossing R-rated comedy of all time. Not long after Crashers, Vince Vaughn invited O'Donnell to join him on the road for his Wild West Comedy Tour, a tour that hit 30 cities in 30 days across the country. O'Donnell would appear on stage with Vaughn as a special guest doing improv skits. The tour was filmed and can be seen as the documentary: Vince Vaughn's Wild West Comedy Show.

In 2002, he played the role of Todd Jarvis in the movie Splat!, a troubled teen who played paintball to help him succeed. O'Donnell re-teamed with Vaughn for The Break-Up. O'Donnell costarred in the indie comedy Flakes with Zooey Deschanel, which premiered at the 2007 South By Southwest Film Festival. O'Donnell also appeared in Henry Bean's film Noise, which was featured at the 2008 Toronto Film Festival. He appeared as the villain Veck Simms in Paul Blart: Mall Cop and appeared in the 2010 romantic comedy, When in Rome, with Kristen Bell and Josh Duhamel. The same year he had a cameo in The Mother of Invention.

Television work
O'Donnell made guest appearances on Lost, CSI, The Closer, and United States of Tara. He made several appearances on the first season of the FX series Sons of Anarchy. He appeared in an episode of It's Always Sunny in Philadelphia, which aired on 2 October 2008. He was part of the ensemble cast of the short-lived ABC documentary-style dramedy, My Generation (2010), developed by Noah Hawley, and later had recurring roles on Hawley's other series Fargo and Legion. In 2011, he had a recurring role on the Showtime series United States of Tara, appearing for the second half of the third season as Evan, Kate's love interest. In 2013, he made a guest appearance on NCIS playing Ramsey Boone.

Filmography

Film

Television

References

External links
 

21st-century American male actors
21st-century Australian male actors
American male film actors
American male television actors
American male video game actors
American male voice actors
Australian male film actors
Australian male television actors
Australian male video game actors
Australian male voice actors
University of Hartford Hartt School alumni
Living people
Place of birth missing (living people)
Year of birth missing (living people)